Anterior superior may refer to:

 Anterior superior alveolar nerve
 Anterior superior iliac spine
 Anterior superior ligament
 Anterior superior pancreaticoduodenal artery